Jaele may refer to:

 Jaele Patrick (born 1988), Australian diver
 Younes Jaele (born 1962), Iranian businessman
 Dèbora e Jaéle (Deborah and Jael), opera by Pizzetti